is a Japanese big-breasted glamour model (kyonyū gravure idol).

Biography
Erina was born October 19, 1985, in Fukuoka Prefecture, Kyūshū island.

After graduation, she worked as a hair model in Fukuoka, and was discovered by a modeling agency. She began her modeling career by posing for Weekly Playboy magazine issued June 19, 2006. She has so far released one photobook (photographed in Thailand by Yasuhiko Kani) and two DVDs. She also appeared non-nude pictorials in various adult magazines.

Erina currently studies painting in art school.

Notes

Japanese gravure idols
Living people
People from Fukuoka
1985 births